In the game of chess, Indian Defence or Indian Game is a broad term for a group of openings characterised by the moves:
1. d4 Nf6

Although the Indian defences were championed in the 1920s by players in the hypermodern school, they were not fully accepted until Russian players showed in the late 1940s that these systems are sound for Black. Since then, the Indian defences have become a popular way for Black to respond to 1.d4 because they often offer a balanced game with winning chances for both sides. Transpositions are important and many variations can be reached by several move orders. It is also possible to transpose back into classical openings such as the Queen's Gambit and the Slav Defence; these are not considered "Indian" openings.

The usual White second move is 2.c4, grabbing a larger share of the centre and allowing the move Nc3, to prepare for moving the e-pawn to e4 without blocking the c-pawn with the knight.  Black's most popular replies are
2...e6, freeing the king's bishop and leading into the Nimzo-Indian Defence, Queen's Indian Defence, Bogo-Indian Defence, Modern Benoni, Catalan Opening, or regular lines of the Queen's Gambit Declined,
2...g6, preparing a fianchetto of the king's bishop and entering the King's Indian Defence or Grünfeld Defence, and
2...c5, the Benoni Defence, with an immediate counter-punch in the centre,

but other moves are played as detailed below.

Instead of 2.c4, White often plays 2.Nf3. Then Black may play 2...d5 which may transpose to a Queen's Gambit after 3.c4. Or Black may play 2...e6 which retains possibilities of transposing to a Queen's Gambit or Queen's Indian Defence. Alternatively 2...g6 may transpose to a King's Indian Defence or Grünfeld Defence, while 2...c5 invites transposition to a Benoni. White can deny Black any of these transpositions by refraining from c2–c4 over the next several moves.

On the second move, White can also play 2.Bg5, the Trompowsky Attack. Black can respond 2...Ne4 (see 1.d4 Nf6 2.Bg5 Ne4), or 2...e6 (see 1.d4 Nf6 2.Bg5 e6), among other moves. A third alternative for White is the rarer 2.Nc3. Then Black may play 2...d5, after which 3.Bg5 is the Richter-Veresov Attack (D01, see 1.d4 Nf6 2.Nc3 d5). Black may also play 2...g6 (see 1.d4 Nf6 2.Nc3 g6).

History
The earliest known use of the term "Indian Defence" was in 1884, and the name was attributed to the openings used by the Indian player Moheschunder Bannerjee against John Cochrane. Philip W. Sergeant describes Moheschunder as having been as of 1848 "a Brahman in the Mofussil—up country, as we might say—who had never been beaten at chess!" Sergeant wrote in 1934 (substituting algebraic notation for his descriptive notation):The Indian Defences by g6 coupled with d6, or b6 coupled with e6, were largely taught to European players by the example of Moheschunder and other Indians, to whom the fianchetto developments were a natural legacy from their own game. The fondness for them of the present Indian champion of British chess, Mir Sultan Khan, is well known. But they are now so widely popular that Dr. S. G. Tartakover was able to declare, some years ago, that "to-day fianchettos are trumps." A sequel hardly to have been anticipated from the discovery of Moheschunder in the Mofussil!

In the following game, Moheschunder (Black) plays the Grünfeld Defence against Cochrane in 1855—some 38 years before Ernst Grünfeld was born.

John Cochrane vs. Moheschunder Bannerjee, May 1855: 1.d4 Nf6 2.c4 g6 3.Nc3 d5 4.e3 Bg7 5.Nf3 0-0 6.cxd5 Nxd5 7.Be2 Nxc3 8.bxc3 c5 9.0-0 cxd4 10.cxd4 Nc6 11.Bb2 Bg4 12.Rc1 Rc8 13.Ba3 Qa5 14.Qb3 Rfe8 15.Rc5 Qb6 16.Rb5 Qd8 17.Ng5 Bxe2 18.Nxf7 Na5 and White mates in three (19.Nh6+ double check Kh8 20.Qg8+ Rxg8 21.Nf7).

Another of the games between these players transposed to what would today be called the Four Pawns Attack against the King's Indian Defence. This time Moheschunder, as Black, won after some enterprising (and perhaps dubious) sacrificial play:

1.e4 d6 2.d4 g6 3.c4 Bg7 4.Nc3 Nf6 5.f4 0-0 6.Nf3 Bg4 7.Bd3 e5 8.fxe5 dxe5 9.d5 Nxe4 10.Nxe4 f5 11.Neg5 e4 12.Ne6 exf3! 13.Nxd8 fxg2 14.Rg1 Bxd1 15.Ne6 Bg4 16.Nxf8 Kxf8 17.Rxg2 Nd7 18.Bf4 Nc5 19.Kd2 Rc8 20.Kc2 Bf3 21.Rf2 Nxd3 22.Kxd3 Be4+ 23.Ke3 b5 24.cxb5 Bxd5 25.Rd2 Bc4 26.Rad1 Bf6 27.Bh6+ Kg8 28.Kf4 Re8 29.b3 Bxb5 30.Rc1 Be2! 31.Re1 Re4+ 32.Kg3 Bh4+ 0–1

The term "Indian Defence" was popularized by Savielly Tartakower in the early 1920s. In his 1924 book Die hypermoderne Schachpartie, Tartakower classifies the Indian Defences under the broad headings "Old Indian" (...d6 and eventual ...g6) and "Neo-Indian" (...e6 and eventual ...b6). Under the heading "Old Indian", he considers the openings now known as the King's Indian and Grünfeld Defences. He also proposes the names "Proto-Indian" for 1.d4 d6, "Pseudo-Indian" for 1.d4 c5, "Semi-Indian" for 1.d4 Nf6 2.Nc3 and "Three Quarter Indian" for 1.d4 Nf6 2.Nd2, none of which came into wider use.

The modern names "King's Indian Defence", "Queen's Indian Defence", "Old Indian Defence" and "King's Indian Attack" were attributed by Richard Reti to Hans Kmoch, though Réti himself did not approve of these terms. Réti also attributed to Kmoch the terms "All Indian Defence" (where Black fianchettoes both bishops after 1.d4 Nf6) and "Queen's Indian Attack" (where White opens 1.Nf3 and 2.b3) but these did not come into general use.

Main lines beginning 2.c4

2...e6

Nimzo-Indian Defence: 3.Nc3 Bb4 

Advocated by Nimzowitsch as early as 1913, the Nimzo-Indian Defence was the first of the Indian systems to gain full acceptance. It remains one of the most popular and well-respected defences to 1.d4, and White often chooses move orders designed to avoid it. Black attacks the centre with pieces and is prepared to trade a bishop for a knight to weaken White's queenside with doubled pawns.

Queen's Indian Defence: 3.Nf3 b6 

The Queen's Indian Defence is considered solid, safe, and perhaps somewhat drawish. Black often chooses the Queen's Indian when White avoids the Nimzo-Indian by playing 3.Nf3 instead of 3.Nc3. Black constructs a sound position that makes no positional concessions, although sometimes it is difficult for Black to obtain good winning chances. Karpov is a leading expert in this opening. Many Queen's Indian Defence players also play the Nimzo-Indian Defence, and in fact the line 3.Nf3 b6 4.Nc3 Bb4 is sometimes called the "Nimzo/Queen's Indian Hybrid" or similar, and could be classified under either opening.

Bogo-Indian Defence: 3.Nf3 Bb4+ 
The Bogo-Indian Defence is a solid alternative to the Queen's Indian, into which it sometimes transposes. The classical 4.Bd2 Qe7 is also often seen, although more recently 4...a5!? and even 4...c5!? have emerged as alternatives. Transposition to the Nimzo-Indian with 4.Nc3 is perfectly playable but rarely seen, since most players who play 3.Nf3 do so in order to avoid that opening.

Blumenfeld Countergambit: 3.Nf3 c5 4.d5 b5 
The Blumenfeld Countergambit bears a superficial but misleading resemblance to the Benko Gambit, as Black's goals are very different. Black gambits a wing pawn in an attempt to build a strong centre. White can either accept the gambit or decline it to maintain a small positional advantage. Although the Blumenfeld is playable for Black it is not very popular.

Catalan Opening: 3.Nf3, 4.g3, 5.Bg2, 6.d4 
The Catalan Opening features a quick  of White's .

Others
 3.Nf3 b5 Polish Defence
 3.Nf3 Ne4 Döry Defence (see 1.d4 Nf6 sidelines)
 3.Bg5 Neo-Indian Attack (see 1.d4 Nf6 sidelines)
 3.a3?! Australian Attack

2...g6

Grünfeld Defence: 3.Nc3 d5 

Ernst Grünfeld debuted the Grünfeld Defence in 1922. Distinguished by the move 3...d5, Grünfeld intended it as an improvement to the King's Indian which was not considered entirely satisfactory at that time. The Grünfeld has been adopted by World Champions Smyslov, Fischer, and Kasparov.

King's Indian Defence: 3.Nc3 Bg7 

The King's Indian Defence is aggressive and somewhat risky, and generally indicates that Black will not be satisfied with a draw. Although it was played occasionally as early as the late 19th century, the King's Indian was considered inferior until the 1940s when it was featured in the games of Bronstein, Boleslavsky, and Reshevsky. It was Fischer's favoured defence to 1.d4, but its popularity faded in the mid-1970s. Kasparov's successes with the defence restored the King's Indian to prominence in the 1980s.

2...c5

Benoni Defence

The Benoni Defence is a risky attempt by Black to unbalance the position and gain active piece play at the cost of allowing White a pawn wedge at d5 and a central majority. The most common Benoni line is the Modern Benoni (3.d5 e6 4.Nc3). Tal popularised the defence in the 1960s by winning several brilliant games with it, and Bobby Fischer occasionally adopted it, with good results, including a win in his 1972 World Championship match against Boris Spassky. Often Black adopts a slightly different move order, playing 2...e6 before 3...c5 in order to avoid the sharpest lines for White.

Benko Gambit (or Volga Gambit): 3.d5 b5 

The Benko Gambit (known as the Volga Gambit in Russia and Eastern Europe) is one of Black's most popular ways of meeting 1.d4, though it is less common at elite level. Black plays to open lines on the queenside where White will be subject to considerable pressure. If White accepts the gambit, Black's compensation is positional rather than tactical, and his initiative can last even after many piece exchanges and well into the endgame. White often chooses instead either to decline the gambit pawn or return it.

Other 2nd moves for Black

Old Indian Defence: 2...d6 3.Nc3 e5 
The Old Indian Defence was introduced by Tarrasch in 1902, but it is more commonly associated with Chigorin who adopted it five years later. It is similar to the King's Indian in that both feature a ...d6 and ...e5 pawn centre, but in the Old Indian Black's king bishop is developed to e7 rather than being fianchettoed on g7. The Old Indian is solid, but Black's position is usually cramped and it lacks the dynamic possibilities found in the King's Indian.

Budapest Gambit: 2...e5 
The Budapest Gambit is rarely played in grandmaster games, but more often adopted by amateurs. Although it is a gambit, White cannot hold on to his extra pawn without making compromises in the deployment of his pieces, so he often chooses to return the pawn and retain the initiative.

Others

 2...b6 Accelerated Queen's Indian Defence   
The Accelerated Queen's Indian Defence is playable; however, it is considered less accurate than the standard Queen's Indian move order (2...e6 3 Nf3 b6) due to the possibility of 3.Nc3 Bb7 4.Qc2 d5 (otherwise e4 will follow) 5.cxd5 Nxd5 6.Nf3! and White was better in Alekhine–König, Vienna 1922. James Plaskett and Raymond Keene analyse this line in their 1987 book on the English Defence. 
 2...c6 
This normally transposes into the Slav Defence if Black subsequently plays ...d5, however it may also transpose into the Old Indian or even the King's Indian if Black instead follows up with ...d6. One of the few independent lines is the offbeat 2...c6 3.Nf3 b5!?, sometimes called the Kudischewitsch gambit after the Israeli IM David Kudischewitsch.

2...Nc6 Black Knights' Tango   
The Black Knights' Tango or Mexican Defence introduced by Carlos Torre in 1925 in Baden-Baden shares similarities with Alekhine's Defence as Black attempts to induce a premature advance of the white pawns. It may transpose into many other defences.
 2...d6 3.Nc3 Bf5 Janowski Indian Defence
 2...d5?! Marshall Defence
The Marshall Defence (normally reached via the Queen's Gambit after 1.d4 d5 2.c4 Nf6?!) is better for White.

1.d4 Nf6 sidelines
 2.c4 e6 3.Bg5 Neo-Indian Attack
 2.Nf3 and now:
 2...e6 3.Bg5 Torre Attack
 2...g6 East Indian Defence
 2...g6 3.Nc3 d5 4.Bf4 Bg7 5.e3 0-0 6.Be2 Barry Attack
Another option is the Barry Attack,  popular with club players. White usually follows up with Ne5 and h2–h4–h5, a direct attack on the black king. The Barry Attack has also been tried out at grandmaster level by Mark Hebden and Julian Hodgson.
 2...b6 3.Bg5 Torre Attack
 2...h6 3.c4 g5 Nadanian Attack
The Nadanian Attack is an  aggressive attempt by Black to unbalance the position. The early 2...h6 and 3...g5 are designed to deal with  drawish variations such as Colle System, London System and Torre Attack. The line was introduced in 2005 by Ashot Nadanian, but has never enjoyed widespread popularity among top-flight players.
 2...Ne4 Döry Defence
The Döry Defence (2.Nf3 Ne4 or 2.c4 e6 3.Nf3 Ne4) is uncommon, but was the subject of a theme tournament (won by Paul Keres) in Vienna in 1937. It will sometimes transpose into a variation of the Queen's Indian Defence but there are also independent lines.
 2.Bg5 Trompowsky Attack
The Neo-Indian Attack, Torre Attack, and Trompowsky Attack are White anti-Indian variations. Related to the Richter–Veresov Attack, they feature an early Bg5 by White and avoid much of the detailed theory of other queen's pawn openings.

See also
 List of chess openings
 List of chess openings named after places

References

Bibliography

Further reading

Chess openings